In Turkey, compulsory military service applies to all male citizens from 21 to 41 years of age. It is 6 months for all males regardless of education degree. 

Turkish citizens who reside overseas and have worked for at least three consecutive years have the option to pay a certain fee to be exempt from mandatory military service. This requires a fee of €5,563.66 and theoretical military training as of October 2020.

Women are not conscripted, but they are permitted to become officers.

History
Devshirme was the forced conscription of children from non-Turkish families to use them as military slaves since 14th century. The Conscription Law was introduced in 1919 and has stayed in force since then. However, the length of service has been successively reduced over time. Between 1919 and 1998, the average length of service was 18 months for non-educated males and 12 months for educated (University Level.) In 1998, these lengths were reduced to 12 months for non-educated conscripts and 6 months for educated ones. After 2001, the current length of service was introduced, with a bar on further reductions until 2024.

Conscription during state of war

After serving their compulsory service, male citizens are obligated to be recalled up to military service until they are 41 years of age. After males are recalled up, the Turkish parliament can declare that the state is in a critical condition which obliges service from women aged 18 to 42.

Debates about equal service

Yusuf Ziya Özcan, president of YÖK, announced in March 2008 military service duration would be equal for everyone; holding or not holding a degree would not matter. İlker Başbuğ, then president of the Turkish Armed Forces, said that short-term military service and reserve officers system would be abandoned. In this system, he proposed, everybody would spend 12 or 15 months in conscription. Instead of reserve officers, officers would be contracted. In October 2010, instead of the system proposed before, shortening the duration of military service is proposed. In this proposition, short-term privates would spend 4 months, and other people would spend 9 months in conscription. Conscripted 250000 people would be released early. TSK refused this system claiming it would create a shortage of soldiers. However, some people argue conscripts are forced to work for officers' private needs. This includes driving, cooking, hairdressing and serving meals in officers' clubs, teaching to officers' children. Some of the conscripts are made officers' personal assistants. the number of these conscripts is estimated to be 231,000.

Attitude towards conscription, the army and conscripts (draftees)

Most companies require men to have completed their military service before their job candidacies can be accepted. Traditionally, families do not consent to their daughters marrying men who have not served their terms.  The reason behind this requirement is an irregular loss of workforce; the companies are legally bound to discharge draft evaders or face legal consequences, however valuable an asset these people are.
  
It is a common opinion that having completed military service carries a symbolic value to the majority of Turks. It is commonly regarded as a rite of passage to manhood, and most men grow up with the anticipation of serving out their time. On the other hand, it is held to be one of the main reasons behind the brain drain prevalent among well-educated young professionals.

An argument used in defense of conscription is that it serves to intermingle an otherwise stratified society. It is believed that going through the same hardships can make common ground amongst otherwise diverse groups and interconnect them.

Conscientious objection
Refusing obligatory military service due to conscientious objection is illegal in Turkey and punishable with imprisonment by law.  Upon being drafted, soldiers who refuse to serve their conscription can be convicted and made to serve their conscription period in military jail. Upon release, the offender often receives new call-up papers, and if he refuses, he is sent back to serve another sentence.

Notable objectors include Mehmet Tarhan and Osman Murat Ülke.

Sexual orientation and military service 

The Military Health Regulation for the Turkish Armed Forces uses the 1968 American Psychiatric Association's definition of homosexuality as a disease from the Diagnostic and Statistical Manual released that year. As such, homosexuals who are discharged or exempt from military service receive the same report as those who have mental or physical disabilities and are considered to have a psychosexual disorder. In order to receive this report, individuals have to "prove their homosexuality," undergoing what Human Rights Watch calls "humiliating and degrading" examinations.

In October 2009, the report of the EU Commission on Enlargement stated that "The Turkish armed forces have a health regulation that defines homosexuality as a ‘psychosexual’ illness and identifies homosexuals as unfit for military service. Conscripts who declare their homosexuality have to provide photographic proof. A small number have had to undergo humiliating medical examinations." These steps are taken, according to the military, to make sure that the system is not being exploited by deserters in order to skip mandatory military service.

References

Further reading
United Nations HCR report on military service in Turkey
WRI summary on conscientious objection in Turkey
Documentation: Conscientious objection in Turkey
Turkish writer faces jail after incurring wrath of military

 
Military of Turkey
Turkey